Hornostaivka is an urban-type settlement in Kakhovka Raion, Kherson Oblast, southern Ukraine. It is located on the left bank of the Kakhovka Reservoir, an artificial reservoir on the Dnieper. Hornostaivka hosts the administration of Hornostaivka settlement hromada, one of the hromadas of Ukraine. It has a population of

Administrative status 
Until 18 July, 2020, Hornostaivka was the administrative center of Hornostaivka Raion. The raion was abolished in July 2020 as part of the administrative reform of Ukraine, which reduced the number of raions of Kherson Oblast to five. The area of Hornostaivka Raion was merged into Kakhovka Raion.

Economy

Transportation
Hornostaivka has access to a paved road which follows the left bank of the Dnieper and connects Kakhovka with Kamianka-Dniprovska. In Kakhovka, there is access to the Highway M14 connecting Kherson with Mariupol via Melitopol.

See also 

 Russian occupation of Kherson Oblast

References

Urban-type settlements in Kakhovka Raion
Populated places of Kakhovka Reservoir
Populated places on the Dnieper in Ukraine